Abas (died 953) was king of Bagratid Armenia from 928 to 953. He was a member of the Bagratid (Bagratuni) royal dynasty. He was the son of Smbat I and the brother of Ashot II the Iron, whom he succeeded. In contrast to the reign of his predecessors, Abas's reign was mostly peaceful, and he occupied himself with the reconstruction of the war-torn kingdom and the development of his capital at Kars.

Life
Prior to becoming king, Abas served as the kingdom's sparapet (chief general), although he is not to be confused with his uncle, who was also named Abas and also served as sparapet. Abas succeeded his brother King Ashot II after the latter died without an heir in 929. Less is known about Abas's reign than those of his predecessors, as the history of Catholicos Hovhannes Draskhanakerttsi ends in 923-924. 

After ascending the throne, Abas moved the capital of the kingdom from Shirakavan to his fortress-city of Kars. Abas apparently never attempted to reconquer Dvin or expand his kingdom, instead focusing on developing and protecting his capital of Kars. Conflict with the Arabs was minimal too, with the exception of a military defeat Abas suffered near the holy city of Vagharshapat. He was far less conciliatory towards the Byzantines, who had repeatedly demonstrated their unreliability as allies by attacking and annexing Armenian territories. The Byzantines also refused to bestow the title of prince of princes to Abas. However, the Byzantine emperor Romanos I Lekapenos was more focused on fighting the Arab Hamdanids, leaving Abas's kingdom in peace.

The Cathedral of Kars, which remains intact to this day, was constructed sometime during Abas's reign. After its construction, Abas confronted an invasion by a certain Prince Ber of Abkhazia (whose identity remains unknown), who sought to consecrate the church under the Chalcedonian rite. Ber appeared with an army along the river of the Araxes, but Abas refused to make any concessions and ambushed Ber's forces in an assault at dawn. Several more skirmishes took place and Ber was finally captured by Abas's men. Abas took the king to his new church and told him that he would never see it again, blinding him and sending him back to Abkhazia. 

The great monasteries of Horomos (934) and Narek (935) were also constructed during Abas's reign. It was either during Abas's reign or that of his successor that the patriarchal seat of the Armenian church finally returned to Bagratid territory when Catholicos Ananias I moved from Aghtamar in the Kingdom of Vaspurakan to Argina. 

Abas died in 953, leaving his kingdom to his two sons, Ashot III and Mushegh. Ashot became King of Armenia and eventually established his capital at Ani, while Mushegh became King of Kars.

References

Bibliography 

 
 
 

Bagratuni dynasty
Kings of Bagratid Armenia
10th-century monarchs in Asia
Year of birth unknown
953 deaths
10th-century Armenian people